Adoniran Vinícius de Campos (born 12 December 1985 in Santa Bárbara d'Oeste), or simply Adoniran, is a Brazilian defensive midfielder. He last played for Paranavaí.

Career
In May 2009, he was signed by Paraná.

References

External links

 CBF  
  
 
 

1985 births
Living people
People from Santa Bárbara d'Oeste
Brazilian footballers
Esporte Clube São Bento players
União Agrícola Barbarense Futebol Clube players
Ituano FC players
Santos FC players
Guarani FC players
Association football midfielders
Footballers from São Paulo (state)